Ian Hunter is a visual effects artist. He won two Academy Awards for Best Visual Effects for the 2014 film, Interstellar, at the 87th Academy Awards in 2015 and for the 2018 film, First Man, at the 91st Academy Awards in 2019.

Awards

Filmography

References

External links 
 

Best Visual Effects Academy Award winners
Best Visual Effects BAFTA Award winners
Living people
Visual effects artists
Year of birth missing (living people)